Stacey Lamar Mack (born June 26, 1975) is a former American football running back who played 5 seasons in the NFL for the Jacksonville Jaguars and the Houston Texans. He had attended Southwest Community College in Summit, MS from 1995 - 1997 before transferring to Temple University. Stacey was signed as an undrafted free agent by the Jacksonville Jaguars in 1999.

References

1975 births
Living people
Players of American football from Orlando, Florida
American football fullbacks
Southwest Mississippi Bears football players
Temple Owls football players
Jacksonville Jaguars players
Houston Texans players
William R. Boone High School alumni